The Hochmatt is a mountain of the Bernese Alps, located south of Jaun in the canton of Fribourg. It lies west of the Gastlosen chain.

References

External links
 Hochmatt on Hikr

Mountains of the Alps
Two-thousanders of Switzerland
Mountains of the canton of Fribourg
Mountains of Switzerland